Tokeen Seaplane Base  is a public use seaplane base located in Tokeen, in the Prince of Wales-Hyder Census Area in the U.S. state of Alaska.

Although most U.S. airports use the same three-letter location identifier for the FAA and IATA, this airport is assigned TKI by the IATA  and 57A by the FAA (which assigned TKI to McKinney National Airport in McKinney, Texas).

Facilities and aircraft 
Tokeen Seaplane Base has one seaplane landing area designated NE/SW which measures 6,000 by 400 feet (1,829 x 122 m). For the 12-month period ending December 31, 2006, the airport had 55 aircraft operations, an average of 4 per month: 91% air taxi and 9% general aviation.

References

External links 
 FAA Alaska airport diagram (GIF)

Seaplane bases in Alaska
Airports in the Prince of Wales–Hyder Census Area, Alaska